The Panasonic Lumix DMC-GH4 is a  Micro Four Thirds System digital still and video camera originally released in May 2014.  At the time of its release, the GH4 was notable for being the world's first Mirrorless interchangeable-lens camera with 4K Video recording capability.

Features 
The GH4 is largely physically similar to its predecessor, the Panasonic Lumix DMC-GH3, adding only a locking mode dial and more detailed rear LCD screen and Electronic Viewfinder.

The emphasis of the camera is the video with Venus Engine IX processor allow for 4K video and 12 fps continuous shooting. As a 4K video camera, it can be categorized as a pro-level video camera that can record in Cinema 4K mode (4096 x 2160) or standard 4K-UHD (3840 x 2160) using IPB compression in 100Mbit/s. In Full 1080p HD there are two options, 200Mbit/s in ALL-Intra compression, or 100Mbit/s with no recording time limit. The camera also provides .mov, mp4, AVCHD Progressive, and AVCHD video formats at a variety of frame rates according to the usage; and options for VFR (Variable Frame Rate) or Time Lapse/Stop Motion Animation without the need for post-production processing.

Autofocus needs only 0.07 seconds with the 'Depth from Defocus' autofocus system. The camera also has Wi-Fi with NFC, PC sync port, highlight and shadow control, and a 'silent mode' which uses the electronic shutter only. Video features added to the DMC-GH4 include Focus peaking, zebra overlay, luminance level adjustment, and cinema gamma presets.

DMW-YAGH Interface
Along with the GH4, Panasonic also released the YAGH interface unit, a camera-attached device to increase input and output options for the GH4.  The YAGH connects to the GH4 via attachment screw on the bottom of the camera, as well as a sliding mechanism which plugs into the camera's HDMI port on the side.  The interface contains two 3-pin XLR Connector inputs, which are controlled by a pair of preamplifiers inside the unit, offering phantom power, more control over input gain levels and microphone choice, and input metering via LED meters on the interface.  The YAGH also provides a timecode input for multi-device synchronization.

For outputs, the YAGH offers four BNC connector terminals for Serial Digital Interface use with outboard recorders and monitors.  In addition, a full-size HDMI port is also present.  These video outputs differ from the camera's native recording in that they offer a 10-bit 4:2:2 signal rather than the camera's internal 8-bit 4:2:0.

The YAGH interface is not powered by the camera, instead relying on 12-volt DC power provided by a separate battery or power supply using a four-pin XLR type connector.

References

External links 
 Official specifications
 DMC-GH4 User Manual
 DMW-YAGH User Manual

GH4